The National Basketball League Coach of the Year is an annual National Basketball League (NBL) award given since the 1989 New Zealand NBL season to the best head coach of the regular season.

In September 2021, the Coach of the Year award was named in honour of Steve McKean following his death. McKean was coach of the Tall Blacks from 1972–1981 and received the Basketball New Zealand Coach of the Year Award in 1978 and 2002. He was the NBL's Coach of the Year in 1992.

Winners 

|}

See also
 List of National Basketball League (New Zealand) awards

References

Awards established in 1989
C